Robert John Parent (born February 19, 1958) is a Canadian retired professional ice hockey goaltender who played three games in the National Hockey League with the Toronto Maple Leafs during the 1981–82 and 1982–83 seasons. The rest of his career, which lasted from 1978 to 1984, was spent in the minor leagues.

Career statistics

Regular season and playoffs

References

External links

1958 births
Living people
Canadian ice hockey goaltenders
Cincinnati Tigers players
Hampton Aces players
Ice hockey people from Ontario
Kitchener Rangers players
Muskegon Mohawks players
New Brunswick Hawks players
Port Huron Flags players
Saginaw Gears players
Sportspeople from Windsor, Ontario
St. Catharines Saints players
Toronto Maple Leafs draft picks
Toronto Maple Leafs players
Windsor Spitfires players